Thamir Stadium is a multi-purpose stadium in Al Salmiya, Kuwait.  It is currently used mostly for football matches and is the home stadium of Al Salmiya Club.  The stadium holds 16,105 people.

External links
Stadium information

References

Football venues in Kuwait
Multi-purpose stadiums in Kuwait